Anthem Wrestling Exhibitions LLC, commonly known by its trade name Impact Wrestling (stylized as IMPACT! Wrestling), is an American professional wrestling promotion based in Nashville, Tennessee. It is a subsidiary of Anthem Sports & Entertainment.

Founded by Jeff and Jerry Jarrett in 2002, the promotion was initially known as NWA: Total Nonstop Action (NWA-TNA) and was associated with the National Wrestling Alliance (NWA), though not an official member. In 2004, the promotion became known as Total Nonstop Action Wrestling (TNA), but it continued to use the NWA World Heavyweight and Tag Team championships as part of its agreement with the NWA. After the agreement ended in 2007, the company created its own TNA World Heavyweight and TNA World Tag Team championships. The promotion was purchased by Anthem at the beginning of 2017 and, in March of that year, was fully rebranded under its current name after its flagship, weekly television series.

From its inception, the promotion had been considered the second-largest in the United States behind WWE. Impact was viewed by some to have fallen behind longtime rival Ring of Honor in 2017, with the loss of their U.S. television contract with Spike in 2014, as well as monetary and personnel issues, being noted as factors to their decline. Since 2019, Impact has been thought by many to have recovered, through its sustained international television distribution, and the purchase by its parent company of AXS TV, which subsequently began carrying Impact programming.  With the establishment of All Elite Wrestling (AEW) that year, and that promotion's high-profile U.S. television deal with TNT (which is seen in more households than AXS), Impact has since been viewed as being the number three U.S. promotion behind both WWE and AEW.

History

Formation and early history (2002–2004) 

The concept of TNA originated shortly after World Championship Wrestling (WCW) ended in 2001, with the World Wrestling Federation (WWF, later WWE) gaining a monopoly on the industry. While on a fishing trip, Bob Ryder, Jeff Jarrett and Jerry Jarrett contemplated their futures in the professional wrestling business. Ryder suggested a company not reliant on television, but rather one going straight to pay-per-view. In July 2002, Vince Russo joined Jeff and Jerry Jarrett's NWA-TNA promotion as a creative writer and would assist in the writing and production of the shows. Russo states that he coined the name "Total Nonstop Action", the initials of the company "TNA" being a play on "T&A". The original intention, as they were exclusive to pay-per-view, was to be viewed as an edgier product than WWE.

Initially, TNA's weekly pay-per-view show operated as the company's main source of revenue, in place of monthly pay-per-view events used by other promotions. These shows took place mostly at the Tennessee State Fairground Sports Arena in Nashville, nicknamed the "TNA Asylum". In October 2002, Panda Energy purchased a controlling interest (72%) of Total Nonstop Action Wrestling. TNA (which originally traded as "JSports and Entertainment") was renamed "TNA Entertainment". Dixie Carter was appointed president of TNA Entertainment in spring 2003. Xplosion launched on November 27, 2002, as TNA's first regular cable show and featured exclusive matches taped at the TNA Asylum as well as exclusive interviews with TNA wrestlers. The last weekly pay-per-view took place on September 8, 2004.

Growth and surging popularity (2004–2009) 

In May 2004, TNA introduced its second weekly television program, Impact! (stylized as iMPACT!), produced at Soundstage 21, nicknamed the "Impact Zone", at Universal Studios Florida and broadcast on Fox Sports Net (FSN). With the show's première, TNA introduced a six-sided wrestling ring, the implementation of the "Fox Box" displaying competitors and timekeeping for the match and a generally more sports-like style than the sports entertainment style exemplified by WWE.

TNA would subsequently discontinue producing weekly pay-per-views in favor of a traditional monthly pay-per-view schedule, beginning with Victory Road in November 2004. TNA's television contract with Fox Sports expired in May 2005. Without television exposure, Impact! would continue to air through webcastsoriginally made available via BitTorrent and eventually via RealPlayerand replace Xplosions timeslot on Urban America Television.

In August 2005, Marvel Toys launched the first line of TNA action figures, which included a six-sided ring and Ultimate X playset.

On September 11, 2005, TNA held its Unbreakable pay per view. Unbreakable is remembered for the three-way match main event for the TNA X Division Championship, between AJ Styles, Christopher Daniels, and Samoa Joe, which received a rare 5Star match rating from wrestling journalist Dave Meltzer, the first and currently the only one the company had received.

Later that year, TNA would later secure a television deal with Spike TV; Impact! debuted on the network on October 1, 2005. The episode saw Team 3D make their TNA debut. TNA would gain attention for the many high-profile wrestlers that would join the promotion during Impacts run on Spike. From 2005 to 2009, these include Kevin Nash, Rhino, Christian Cage, Sting (who made appearances at previous "Asylum" shows), Scott Steiner, Kurt Angle, Booker T, and Mick Foley.

In April 2006, TNA launched a YouTube channel, featuring clips from Impact and exclusive content. Beginning with Bound for Glory in October 2006, TNA began holding select pay-per-view events outside of Orlando, Florida. In January 2007, TNA announced a deal with New Motion, Inc. which led to the introduction of TNA Mobile service. TNA has also launched "TNA U TV"; podcasts aired through YouTube to help promote the company.

In March 2008, Tristar Productions acquired an exclusive license deal to produce and distribute TNA trading cards and memorabilia. On September 9, 2008, Midway Games released the TNA Impact! video game. On October 23, 2008, TNA began producing its programming in HD. In addition, a new HD set for Impact was introduced, including new lighting, and large high-resolution screens.

On June 21, 2009, TNA launched an online video-vault subscription-service where subscribers could watch past pay-per-views by choosing one of three payment options.

 Hulk Hogan, Eric Bischoff, and Dixie Carter leadership (2010–2013) 

In October 2009, TNA President Dixie Carter hired Hulk Hogan and former WCW President Eric Bischoff. Both obtained a position behind the scenes; with Bischoff part of creative and Hogan as a consultant. Under their tenure, TNA would see several revamps in 2010. Beginning with Genesis in January, TNA returned to using a four-sided ring. That month, Jakks Pacific announced a five-year agreement to produce TNA action figures. Impact! would also begin airing on Monday nights directly opposite of WWE Raw, marking the first time that two major professional wrestling promotions would go head to head since the launch of WCW Monday Nitro in 1995. The show would permanently move to Mondays on March 8, 2010, Spike would keep the Thursday night slot open for repeats of the Monday night shows. During this time, Ric Flair, Rob Van Dam, Mr. Anderson would make their debuts, while Jeff Hardy would make his return. Impact! would later return to Thursday nights on May 3.

During the May 3, 2011 Impact! television tapings, the show would change its name to Impact Wrestling. On November 7, 2011, TNA revealed that Ohio Valley Wrestling (OVW) would become TNA's official developmental territory. In December 2011, TNA debuted their new India-based subsidiary promotion Ring Ka King. On May 31, 2012, Impact Wrestling began airing live at a new start time of 8 p.m. EST on Thursday nights. The live schedule would continue throughout 2012. In March 2013, TNA began taping Impact from different venues around the United States and terminated its lease with Universal Studios. On March 14, TNA introduced a new universal HD stage which would be used for all weekly programming. On November 2, TNA ended its relationship with OVW.

TNA formed a relationship with Japanese promotion Wrestle-1 beginning in July 2013 with a meeting between TNA founder Jeff Jarrett and Wrestle-1 head Keiji Mutoh. It was arranged for Jarrett to wrestle for W-1 in October 2013. In November, A.J. Styles successfully defended the TNA World Heavyweight Championship at a Wrestle-1 show in Japan.

Hulk Hogan's contract with TNA expired in October 2013, ending his time as creative consultant with the company.

 Departures and financial troubles (2013–2016) 

From the period of 2013 to 2014, many well-known names or veterans of the company left TNA.  In December 2013, AJ Styles left TNA after his contract expired. Styles later said that he could not accept TNA's new contract offer, which would see him take a 60% cut in pay. TNA founder Jeff Jarrett would resign from the company in December 2013, but remained an "investor". The following year Jarrett revealed plans to start a new professional wrestling promotion, Global Force Wrestling. Further departures in 2014 included TNA veterans Sting, Chris Sabin, Hernandez, Christopher Daniels and Kazarian all leaving the company in that year, and the contracts of TNA Hall of Famers Bully Ray and Devon reportedly expired in October 2014, with TNA moving them to the alumni section of their roster in January 2015.

In late July, the TMZ website reported that Spike TV was not renewing Impact Wrestling beyond October. TNA would refute the report, stating that negotiations were still ongoing. On August 14, Impact Wrestling moved to Wednesday nights. On August 20, TNA signed an extension with Spike TV until the end of 2014.

In November 2014, TNA announced a new agreement with Discovery Communications to distribute its programming in the United States on Destination America and to selected international markets. Spike's outreach at the time was estimated to be more than 97 million homes while Destination America was estimated to reach 59 million households. Impact Wrestling ceased airing new televised events on Spike after the November 19 episode. The final episodes of 2014 were Best of TNA clip shows. On January 7, 2015, Impact Wrestling moved to Destination America, with a live debut from The Manhattan Center's Grand Ballroom in New York City.

In addition to Impact Wrestling, which was now airing on Friday nights, two new shows produced were Impact Wrestling: Unlocked, hosted by Mike Tenay, and TNA Wrestling's Greatest Matches, a series presenting the best matches in the company's history. From December 2014 to March 2015, several employees re-signed with TNA, including Kurt Angle, Jeff Hardy, Gail Kim, Mr. Anderson, Abyss and Matt Hardy. Awesome Kong also re-joined the company following several years of absence. During this period, veteran Samoa Joe and commentator Tazz left the company by mutual consent.

On April 27, 2015, Smashing Pumpkins frontman Billy Corgan joined TNA as senior producer of creative and talent development.

Destination America gained over 41.94 million viewers over the course of 2015's first quarter, making this the channel's best first quarter ever, followed by their best May ever in prime time. In both cases, Discovery Communications touted Impact Wrestling as one of the reasons for the increase in viewers. Despite this success, Discovery Communications dropped Unlocked and Greatest Matches from their programming in May 2015.

On November 19, TNA signed a deal with Pop TV to air Impact Wrestling, where it premiered on Tuesday, January 5, 2016, in a live special held at the Sands Hotel and Casino in Bethlehem, Pennsylvania. With this move to Pop, Impact Wrestling introduced a new HD set, graphics and theme music. This show saw the semi-finals and finals of the TNA World Title Series, which was won by Ethan Carter III. Husband and wife team Mike Bennett and Maria Kanellis would debut soon after. Subsequent shows would include episodes taped during a tour of England, which would be the last TNA appearances for Kurt Angle. TNA returned to taping Impact Wrestling at the Impact Zone at Universal Studios in Orlando, Florida, beginning with a live Impact Wrestling on March 15. On March 19, longtime TNA wrestlers Eric Young and Bobby Roode left the promotion after 12 years. On April 22, Velvet Sky, another longtime TNA wrestler, left the company.

On August 12, Billy Corgan became the promotion's new president, while Dixie Carter became chairwoman and chief strategy officer.

On October 13, Corgan sued TNA due to an unpaid debt which Corgan claimed TNA has defaulted on. The State of Tennessee has also put a lien on TNA for unpaid taxes. Anthem Sports & Entertainment, parent company of Impact Wrestlings Canadian broadcaster, Fight Network, offered to help TNA and repay Corgan for the loans, while also offering additional financial assistance to TNA to help keep them from filing for bankruptcy. On October 31, Corgan lost his injunction that kept TNA from selling the company, but TNA was required to pay Corgan back by November 1. It was possible that one of the other minority owners could pay Corgan, effectively making them the majority owner of TNA.

On November 3, the company revealed that Anthem Sports & Entertainment provided a credit facility to fund operations for TNA and that Corgan was no longer with the company as president. However, Corgan himself stated that neither TNA nor Anthem Sports & Entertainment had yet repaid the $2.7million debt that was owed to him by TNA and, as such, he was considering suing, as well as converting the debt into a 36 percent stake. As the result of a settlement between Corgan and TNA, Anthem Sports & Entertainment had acquired the loans Corgan made to Carter.

 Acquisition by Anthem and re-branding (2017–present) 

Anthem Sports & Entertainment, a company owned by former Canwest CEO Leonard Asper, purchased a majority stake of TNA, re-organizing TNA's parent company. Dixie Carter retained a five percent minority stake in the company, but resigned as chairwoman after fourteen years with the company and joined Fight Media Group's advisory board. The promotion's parent company, TNA Entertainment, was changed firstly to Impact Ventures and then to Anthem Wrestling Exhibitions, LLC., with Anthem's Executive Vice President Ed Nordholm becoming President of the new parent company. On January 5, Jeff Jarrett was brought back by Anthem to serve as a consultant. Anthem re-branded the promotion as Impact Wrestling, after its primary television series two months later. Wrestlers Drew Galloway, Matt Hardy, Jeff Hardy, Jade, Crazzy Steve, Mike Bennett and Maria Kanellis left the company during this period.

On April 20, Impact announced a merger with Jarrett's Global Force Wrestling (GFW). The company subsequently announced that they were re-branding again and taking the GFW''' name in June; the re-branding was short-lived as they severed ties with Jarrett that October. During that time, Anthem launched the Global Wrestling Network, a new streaming service which featured content from to their tape library and other sources. Jarrett subsequently filed a lawsuit against Anthem in the District Court of Tennessee for copyright infringement over the GFW rights; the lawsuit was ultimately settled out of court.

Don Callis and Scott D'Amore became executive vice presidents in January 2018, taking charge of Impact Wrestling's day-to-day operations. At the first tapings under their tenure, the company reverted to a traditional four-sided ring, and the show also saw the return of former World Heavyweight Champion Austin Aries, as well the debuts of new wrestlers such as Kiera Hogan, Su Yung, Pentagón Jr., Fénix and Brian Cage. The company also announced a partnership with live streaming service Twitch to produce content for their platform, starting with Brace for Impact, which was co-promoted with New Jersey-based promotion WrestlePro. Their first live show was Impact vs. Lucha Underground, a co-promoted show with Lucha Underground.Impact! subsequently moved to Pursuit Channel beginning January 11, 2019. Two months later, the promotion announced that Ohio Valley Wrestling (OVW) would serve as its developmental territory once again. In May, Impact Plus replaced the Global Wrestling Network as the official streaming app for the promotion. Impact! began airing on Anthem-owned AXS TV after Bound for Glory in October.

Due to the COVID-19 pandemic, Impact would hold events behind closed doors at Skyway Studios in Nashville. During the pandemic, the promotion cancelled its planned TNA: There's No Place Like Home event, and Tessa Blanchard, who became the first woman to win the promotion's World Championship earlier that year at Hard to Kill, was fired and stripped of the championship after a long absence. Slammiversary saw the returns of The Motor City Machine Guns, Eric Young, Doc Gallows and EC3, as well as the debuts of Karl Anderson and Heath Slater.

After the events of AEW Winter Is Coming on December 2, 2020, Impact began a partnership with All Elite Wrestling (AEW), which lasted until Bound for Glory 2021. AEW-contracted wrestlers Kenny Omega and Christian Cage held the Impact World Championship during this time; this marked Cage's first in-ring return to the promotion since 2008. In February 2021, Impact launched Before the Impact (abbreviated as BTI), and Xplosion was canceled after 19 years the following month. During No Surrender Impact announced a new partnership with New Japan Pro-Wrestling (NJPW).
Don Callis' time as Impact executive vice president and on-air talent ended in May.

Slammiversary 2021 marked the return of in-person spectators for the first time since the start of the COVID-19 pandemic. That month, BTI and Impact! would crossover for the first time, when Josh Alexander faced T. J. Perkins for the X Division Championship in Impact's first-ever 60-minute Iron man match, which began on BTI and concluded in the opening minutes of Impact!. Impact subsequently announced the end of their partnership with Twitch that August and launched a new YouTube membership program called "Impact Wrestling Insiders".

In November 2022, Impact and DAZN signed a partnership where the streaming service will distribute select non-live shows in most countries except the United States, South Asia and sub-Saharan Africa.

 Ownership 

The promotion was originally formed by the Jarretts under a parent company known as JSports & Entertainment, LLC.

Panda Energy International purchased a controlling interest (71%) in the company in 2002 from Jerry Jarrett, re-incorporating it as TNA Entertainment, LLC, in the process. In 2012, Panda Energy divested itself of its stake in TNA. Dixie Carter, the daughter of Panda Energy founder Robert Carter, who had been serving as TNA's president, acquired that stake, making her TNA's majority shareholder. Jeff Jarrett departed the company on December 22, 2013, but remained as minority shareholder until his temporary return on June 24, 2015, with the deal for his return including the transfer of his minority stake to Dixie Carter, making her sole shareholder.

According to a report on August 7, 2015, TNA filed a new business name of Impact Ventures, LLC. It was reported near the beginning of 2016 that Aroluxe Marketing, a Brentwood, Tennessee-based marketing agency, had taken a stake in TNA at the start of 2016 in return for providing partial funding, as well as taking over TNA's production operations. It was reported in June 2016 that Smashing Pumpkins frontman Billy Corgan acquired a minority stake in TNA from Dixie Carter, but he had instead provided a loan to Carter. Then on August 12, TNA appointed Corgan as the company's new president and the transition of Carter from president to the company's new chairman and chief strategy officer. It was reported on September 16 by the New York Post that Canada's Fight Network, through its parent company, Anthem Sports & Entertainment Corporation, had taken a stake in TNA. On November 4, Corgan was removed as president, then on November 30 it also reported that Corgan had settled his lawsuit against TNA, with Anthem Sports & Entertainment Corp acquiring the loans Corgan made to Dixie in the process.

In early 2017, TNA would go through a restructuring period that would see an ownership change, with Anthem taking 85 percent, Aroluxe 10 percent and Dixie Carter 5 percent. On January 4, 2017, Anthem Sports & Entertainment purchased an 85 percent majority stake of the company, re-organizing TNA's parent company to Anthem Wrestling Exhibitions, LLC, and Carter resigned as chairwoman after 14 years in charge, while joining the advisory board of Fight Media Group. Ed Nordholm, Anthem's executive vice president, then took over Anthem Wrestling Exhibitions as president.

Shortly after Anthem's acquisition of TNA, it was re-branded to Impact Wrestling. On January 5, Jeff Jarrett was brought back to the company by Anthem as an executive consultant, and later promoted to executive producer and chief creative officer. In April 2017, it was announced on Impact! that the promotion would "merge" with Jarrett's newer Global Force Wrestling promotion. In the lead-up to the Slammiversary XV PPV, Anthem officially announced its intent to acquire GFW to formalize the merger. However, after he took an indefinite leave of absence, the promotion later cut ties with Jarrett and had reverted to the Impact Wrestling brand on October 23. The deal for Anthem to acquire GFW was never completed.

 Television and touring schedule 
 Weekly pay-per-views (2002–2004) 
From June 2002 until September 2004, the promotion's original weekly pay-per-view shows took place mostly at the Tennessee State Fairground Sports Arena in Nashville, Tennessee, nicknamed the "TNA Asylum". There were a total of 111 weekly pay-per-views.

 Impact! and Xplosion (2004–2013) 

From June 2004 to March 2013, TNA programming was taped at Universal Studios Florida's Soundstage 21. The Soundstages at Universal were dubbed the "Impact Zone" by the company. Pay-per-views were also broadcast from that location until October 2006, when Bound for Glory emanated from the Compuware Arena in Detroit.

Initially, TNA worked with Hermie Sadler's United Wrestling Federation in 2005 to create house shows. TNA permitted the usage of the ring and for championships to be defended at these events. TNA started running independent house shows on March 17, 2006. They would continue to work with United Wrestling Federation and promote independent shows at the same time, until 2007. In 2007, TNA first toured Europe, hosting two shows at Porto and Lisbon in Portugal with APW Wrestling. In 2008, TNA wrestlers appeared at Wrestle Kingdom II in Japan. Later on in 2008, TNA conducted its first tour of England, with most shows selling out. The promotion first toured Germany, Scotland and Ireland in 2009, France, Wales and the United Arab Emirates in 2010 and Belgium in 2012.

In August 2007, live-events coordinator Craig Jenkins stated that TNA intended to stage eight pay-per-views and 96 house shows outside Orlando, Florida, in 2008.

In 2009, during their United Kingdom tour, a house show at Wembley Arena in London broke TNA's attendance records. On July 2, 2010, MCU Park hosted a live TNA house show, which also broke the TNA domestic attendance record at the time and is currently the most attended live TNA house show in the United States, with a capacity crowd of 5,550.

 Outside the Impact Zone (2013–2017) 
On January 31, 2013, TNA announced that they would tape their programming in different venues around the United States, with the first live show being held on March 14, in the Sears Centre in Hoffman Estates, Illinois (a Chicago suburb). Unable to cover the rising costs of taping on the road, TNA would return to Universal Studios on November 21, 2013. The promotion would continue to occasionally tape programming from other venues; such as the Sands Casino Event Center in Bethlehem, Pennsylvania; the Manhattan Center's Grand Ballroom in New York City; The SSE Hydro in Glasgow; Manchester Arena in Manchester; Wembley Arena in London, as part of a January 2015 tour.

In June 2017, the then-recently rebranded Impact Wrestling held a show in India, becoming the first major U.S. promotion to hold events that country. After Bound for Glory 2017 in November 2017, Impact would do a set of tapings in Ottawa.

 Post-Universal Studios (2018–present) 
Following the 2018 Redemption pay-per-view, Impact Wrestling would return to touring, taping in various smaller venues. The year's taping locations included Windsor, Ontario, Toronto, Mexico City, New York City, and Las Vegas. Impact hasn't returned to Universal Studios since then, and would later sell set items from their soundstage in Orlando.

In 2019, Impact Wrestling held tapings in Philadelphia, Dallas, New York City, Houston, Windsor, Mexico City, Nashville, Toronto, Rahway, Fort Campbell, Owensboro, and other venues in Ontario.

During the height of the COVID-19 pandemic, Impact Wrestling programming was taped and held behind closed doors at Skyway Studios in the promotion's  home base of Nashville, Tennessee from April 2020 through June 2021. Beginning with Slammiversary in July 2021, fans were allowed in attendance at Skyway. On October 23, 2021, Impact held their first event outside of Nashville in a year and a half with Bound for Glory, which took place just outside of Las Vegas in Sunrise Manor, Nevada.

After a brief Las Vegas area residency to end 2021, Impact resumed a full schedule of live touring in January 2022.

In March 2023, Impact is scheduled to hold events in Windsor, Ontario, Canada.  This would mark their first shows outside of the U.S. in three years.

 Partnerships 
 International 
Impact Wrestling has worked with several international wrestling promotions, with championships from those promotions sometimes having been defended at Impact Wrestling events. Among the organizations Impact has had working relationships with are Mexico's Consejo Mundial de Lucha Libre (CMLL) from 2007 to 2009 and The Crash, Japan's Inoki Genome Federation (IGF), New Japan Pro-Wrestling (NJPW), Wrestle-1 (W-1) and Pro Wrestling Noah (Noah).

The initial relationship with NJPW lasted from 2008 to 2011. Then-known as TNA Wrestling, the promotion would send wrestlers to participate in NJPW's annual Wrestle Kingdom events, as well as NJPW sending future IWGP Heavyweight Champion Kazuchika Okada on a training excursion to TNA. The relationship would be strained, when IWGP Tag Team Champions Team 3D were held off of a New Japan tour in favor of appearing on Impact Wrestling tapings and Okada was given a Green Hornet-inspired gimmick, a decision Executive Vice President Scott D'Amore has since apologized for on behalf of the previous regime.

On March 2, 2014, TNA collaborated with Wrestle-1 in producing the Kaisen: Outbreak supershow in Tokyo, Japan, where three TNA championships were defended.Sanada . Impactwrestling.com (August 14, 2014). Retrieved on August 18, 2014. In May 2015, it was reported that the relationship between TNA and Wrestle-1 had ended.

Since 2015, the promotion has had a working agreement with Mexico's Lucha Libre AAA Worldwide (AAA) and in 2018, announced a partnership with the AAA-affiliated Lucha Underground, allowing their wrestlers from the show to appear for Impact on a regular basis. In April 2018, the two promotions held Impact vs Lucha Underground from WrestleCon in New Orleans to a sell out crowd.

 National 

In early 2006, the promotion began a collaboration with Hermie Sadler's United Wrestling Federation. The agreement permitted UWF to use the TNA logo on posters and signage, as well as to use the six-sided ring with TNA branding. These shows were mainly promoted as 'UWF/TNA' events. The TNA name agreement ended at the end of 2006, as TNA began to promote their own house show events, though UWF still used a six-sided ring. These events were recorded and released on DVD by Highsports.

Impact Wrestling has worked with North American independent promotions in various collaborative efforts, such as the original Global Force Wrestling (another promotion founded by Jeff Jarrett), OMEGA Championship Wrestling (owned by Matt Hardy, Jeff Hardy and Gregory Helms) and Evolve Wrestling. Since 2018, Impact has established working relationships with a number of promotions to co-promote house shows, Twitch specials, the final Impact One Night Only events, and Impact Plus Monthly Specials. These promotions include, Future Stars of Wrestling, Smash Wrestling, AML Wrestling, Superkick'd, Border City Wrestling, WrestleCade, Rocky Mountain Pro, Rockstar Pro Wrestling, Wrestlepro, Wrestling Revolver, RISE, Destiny Wrestling, Big Time Wrestling (California), DEFY Wrestling and House of Hardcore.

Impact Wrestling would begin a partnership with All Elite Wrestling in December 2020, and also furthered its re-established relationship with NJPW in February 2021. With AEW also beginning a partnership with NJPW, commentators and analysts have describe these events as the establishment of a greater territory system, a concept dubbed by AEW as "The Forbidden Door". In October 2021, the working relationship between Impact and AEW ended following Bound for Glory.

On the January 7, 2022 episode of SmackDown, it was announced that Knockouts Champion Mickie James would enter the 2022 Royal Rumble match. Both WWE's official Twitter account and Impact's website confirmed this soon after, with the former recognizing James as an Impact champion.

 Features 

 X Division 

The X Division is known for its high-flying, high-risk style matches. While most wrestlers who perform are under , thus being cruiserweights, Impact would emphasize the high-risk nature of the moves that these wrestlers perform by removing all restraints from competing in the X Division and allowing wrestlers to perform almost stunt-like moves. The slogan "It's not about weight limits, it's about no limits" has been famously used to describe the division.

In August 2011, a  weight limit was introduced, though it was quietly repealed in March 2012. Further changes introduced in March 2013, including a weight limit of 230 lbs, and all matches being contested as triple threat matches, were also repealed in August.

 Six-sided ring 

From the promotion's first show in June 2002, a standard four-sided wrestling ring was used. In June 2004, with the premiere of Impact!'', TNA switched to a six-sided ring, as occasionally used in AAA. The six-sided ring would be retired in January 2010, only making a brief return for the 2011 Destination X event. In 2014, after a fan-voted poll to determine what type of ring the company would use from June 2014, the six-sided ring would return. The promotion would continue to use the six-sided ring until January 2018.

Contracts 

Impact wrestlers are forbidden by contract from working for other companies with televised wrestling shows, but are free to perform non-televised work for any other independent wrestling promotions, domestic or international, as well as televised events held by foreign promotions that Impact Wrestling is linked to or has a working relationship with (such as AAA and NOAH). Many Impact wrestlers perform regularly for various promotions on the independent circuit in addition to Impact Wrestling weekly shows. In 2012, the company changed its policy, preventing its talent from appearing at any independent events that are later released on DVD. Top wrestlers have guaranteed contracts, but the majority of the roster are paid on a per appearance basis. Impact wrestlers are classified as independent contractors and are not offered health coverage through the promotion. As of November 2017, Impact Wrestling contracts give the performers complete ownership over all intellectual property associated with their characters.

Hall of Fame 

The Hall of Fame was introduced on May 31, 2012. As part of a yearly process, selected inductees are chosen based on their overall contributions to Impact's history. On June 10, at Slammiversary 10, Sting was revealed as the first inductee into the Hall of Fame and his formal induction took place at Bound for Glory in October 2012.

Video games

Championships and accomplishments

Current champions

Defunct championships

See also 
 List of Impact Wrestling personnel
 List of former Impact Wrestling personnel
 List of Impact Wrestling albums
 List of Impact Wrestling pay-per-view events

References

External links 

 

Impact Wrestling
2002 establishments in Tennessee
2002 in professional wrestling
Anthem Sports & Entertainment
Billy Corgan
Companies based in Nashville, Tennessee
Entertainment companies established in 2002
Entertainment companies of Canada
Entertainment companies of the United States
Global Force Wrestling
National Wrestling Alliance members
Professional wrestling in Nashville, Tennessee
Professional wrestling in Orlando, Florida